Newton Falls High School is a public high school in Newton Falls, Ohio. It is the only high school in the Newton Falls Exempted School District. The building houses 6th through 12th grade.  Their mascot is the Tigers. Newton Falls' school colors are orange and black. The current building opened in 1986 after the former high school was destroyed by a tornado.

Sports
The Newton Falls High School building contains two gymnasiums, a full size weight lifting room, an outdoor track and football stadium.
Newton Falls offers the following sports:
soccer, baseball, softball, track, basketball, football, volleyball and golf. Newton Falls athletic teams have participated in the All-American Conference since 2008.

Notable alumni
Jack Kucek, former Major League Baseball pitcher
Earnie Shavers, Heavyweight Boxer

References

External links
  District Website
  OHSAA Newton Falls sports information

High schools in Trumbull County, Ohio
Public high schools in Ohio